"Dear Theodosia" is a 3-minute song from Act 1 of the musical Hamilton, based on the life of Alexander Hamilton, which premiered on Broadway in 2015. Lin-Manuel Miranda wrote both the music and lyrics to the song. The song is sung by the character Aaron Burr, originally performed by Leslie Odom Jr., and Hamilton, originally performed by Miranda.

History
Miranda wrote this song during a week spent in the Dominican Republic, while they were visiting his wife Vanessa Nadal's ill aunt. During this week, the couple met a small dog that they eventually adopted and named Tobillo ("ankle" in Spanish), and Nadal's aunt died. Miranda has written that this song is "the calm in the storm of our show, and it was the calm in the storm of my life in that moment."

Synopsis
The song is sung by Aaron Burr and Alexander Hamilton. They welcome their respective children, Theodosia and Philip, into the world. The men proclaim that they will fight to make the world better for their children. They vow to give their children a better childhood than their own. The Hollywood Reporter acknowledges the coincidence reflected within the song, in which "two orphaned men...contemplate the rewards of fatherhood." Vibe added that this "fatherly ballad...gives the dads a chance to reflect on their childhoods whilst contemplating how to be better with their own kids".

Analysis
The "parenthood song" has a lyrical reference to "Blow Us All Away", in the metaphorical sense of overwhelmingly impressing their parents by their future successes. However, The Huffington Post notes that this lyrical motif will reappear later on in the musical in a more literal context when young Phillip is literally blown away by a gun in a duel during the song "Blow Us All Away".
Theodosia Burr Alston was lost at sea during a hurricane off the coast of South Carolina in January 1812, lending a ghastly morbid humor to the song's title.

Critical reception
The Huffington Post wrote that "If John Legend covered this heartbreaker, I'm sure it would hit top ten." The Hollywood Reporter deemed it a "heartbreaker", too. Yahoo.com declared this the "track of the day" for January 3, 2016, due to a recommendation by a reader who said "I love the way this song tenderly expresses the humbling experience of parenthood shared by two men—both quite roughened to the ways of the world and otherwise vehemently opposed. The common ground of our humanity."

Certifications

Covers
"Dear Theodosia" also appears twice on The Hamilton Mixtape, first sung by Regina Spektor featuring Ben Folds, and another version sung by Chance the Rapper and Francis and the Lights. Spektor and Fold's version peaked at number 38 on the Hot Rock Songs chart, and was performd live as a part of National Symphony Orchestra’s DECLASSIFIED: Ben Folds Presents series.

On December 30, 2018, a cut reprise of the song covered by Sara Bareilles was released as part of the "Hamildrop" project.

References

External links
Hamilton at Internet Broadway Database

2010s ballads
2015 songs
Songs from Hamilton (musical)
Chance the Rapper songs
Ben Folds songs
Sara Bareilles songs
Regina Spektor songs
Francis and the Lights songs
Songs about freedom
Songs about parenthood